The Pârâul Domnului is a right tributary of the river Holod in Romania. It flows into the Holod near the village Holod.

References

Rivers of Romania
Rivers of Bihor County